Kuzina is a confectionery chain founded in 2010. Its headquarter is located in Novosibirsk, Russia. The company sells pastry, sandwiches and coffee. The largest number of stores are located in Novosibirsk, there are also shops in Barnaul, Moscow and Minnesota.

History
The company was founded in 2003 by Russian-American entrepreneur Eric Shogren and Evgenia Golovkova. Initially, canteens were opened in Novosibirsk under the Kuzina brand, but in 2008, during the Great Recession, the canteen chain stopped working.

In 2010, the first confectionery was opened in Novosibirsk under the Kuzina brand. The design has changed significantly: black began to dominate in the decoration etc.

In 2013, the company opened one confectionery in Barnaul.

In 2015, Kuzina opened the first confectionery in Moscow near Aeroport Metro Station.

In 2016, Eric Shogren bought Baker's Wife Confectionery near Minneapolis. In 2017, the building of the former Baker's Wife was occupied by Kuzina. He also just bought Wuollet Bakery of Minneapolis in September 2019

Locations

Russia
 Novosibirsk – 29
 Moscow – 7
 Barnaul – 1

United States
 Minnesota (near Minneapolis) – 1

Gallery

See also
 New York Pizza

References

External links
 «В России всё меняется быстрее — это поразительно». НГС.НОВОСТИ.

Companies based in Novosibirsk
Fast-food chains of Russia
Restaurants established in 2010